The Torrington Gopher Hole Museum, sometimes known as the World Famous Gopher Hole Museum, located in Torrington, Alberta, features 77 stuffed gophers (Richardson's ground squirrels) posed to resemble townspeople in 44 scenes. Around 5,000 people come to the museum every year during the four months the museum is open. Dioramas depict gophers as waterfowl hunters, firefighters, cosmetologists, priests, bank robbers, RCMP officers, pool players, and First Nations people. The Gopher Hole Museum has cost $2 for adults and 50 cents for children since its foundation.

A one-time $9,000 grant from the Government of Alberta was given to Torrington to create a tourist attraction in the small community. The concept was created due to problems with gopher overpopulation in Torrington, leading one woman at a community meeting to jokingly say they should be stuffed and put on display. It was opened in 1996, and over 10,000 people came to visit it the year it opened. A group of women residing in the town, who run, maintain, and have tours for the museum, came up with the ideas for the scenes. The clothes that are worn by every gopher, as well as the backgrounds, were created by hand or bought.

The museum is profiled in Chelsea McMullan's 2015 documentary film World Famous Gopher Hole Museum.

References

Kneehill County
Museums in Alberta
Roadside attractions in Canada
Museums established in 1996
1996 establishments in Alberta
Urocitellus
Taxidermy